Derosiphia is a monotypic genus of flowering plants belonging to the family Melastomataceae. The only species is Derosiphia tubulosa.

The species is found in Tropical Africa.

References

Melastomataceae
Monotypic Myrtales genera